The 2019 season was Sabah's 7th competitive season in the second tier of Malaysian football, the Malaysia Premier League after relegated in 2012. Along with the Malaysia Premier League, the club competes in the Malaysia FA Cup and the Malaysia Cup.

Players

Transfers

1st leg

In:

Out:

2nd leg

In:

Out:

Competitions

Overview

Malaysia Premier League

Table

Results summary

Results by matchday

Fixtures and Results
The Malaysian Football League (MFL) announced the fixtures for the 2019 season on 22 December 2018.

Malaysia FA Cup

Fixture

Malaysia Cup

Group stage

Statistics

Appearances

References

2019
Malaysian football clubs 2019 season